Liga Deportiva Universitaria de Cuenca is a football club based in Cuenca, Ecuador currently in the Second Category Ecuadorian football Championship.

Honors

Championship Champion Provincial Azuay (4): 2004, 2005, 2007, 2010
Serie B (1): 1977 -E1
Runner up of the Series B of Ecuador (1): 1980 -E1
Runner up Second Category (2):  1986, 1988

Football clubs in Ecuador
Association football clubs established in 1972
Cuenca, Ecuador
1972 establishments in Ecuador